Embakasi South is a constituency in Kenya. Embakasi South includes five electoral wards: Imara Daima, Kwa Njenga, Kwa Rueben, Pipeline, and Kware.

References 

Constituencies in Nairobi